Henry Samuel Fitzherbert (11 September 1851 – 5 February 1912) was a 19th-century Member of Parliament in Wellington, New Zealand and a lawyer.

He was educated at Christ's College, Christchurch and Melbourne University. He was a lawyer in Wellington and Palmerston North, and later a magistrate in New Plymouth.

He was the younger son of William Fitzherbert, and his brother William Alfred Fitzherbert was mayor of Lower Hutt. His sister Alice married Sir Patrick Buckley.

References

1851 births
1912 deaths
Members of the New Zealand House of Representatives
New Zealand MPs for Hutt Valley electorates
19th-century New Zealand politicians
19th-century New Zealand lawyers